Edvard Valpas-Hänninen (6 September 1873, Saarijärvi – 11 January 1937) was a Finnish journalist and politician. He was a Member of the Parliament of Finland from 1907 to 1918, representing the Social Democratic Party of Finland (SDP). During the Finnish Civil War of 1918, he sided with the Reds and fled to Soviet Russia after the defeat of the Red side. He returned to Finland in 1920 and was imprisoned from 1920 to 1924 for his role on the defeated side of the Civil War. Valpas-Hänninen received a presidential pardon in 1924.

References

1873 births
1937 deaths
People from Saarijärvi
People from Vaasa Province (Grand Duchy of Finland)
Social Democratic Party of Finland politicians
Members of the Parliament of Finland (1907–08)
Members of the Parliament of Finland (1908–09)
Members of the Parliament of Finland (1909–10)
Members of the Parliament of Finland (1910–11)
Members of the Parliament of Finland (1911–13)
Members of the Parliament of Finland (1913–16)
Members of the Parliament of Finland (1916–17)
Members of the Parliament of Finland (1917–19)
Finnish journalists
People of the Finnish Civil War (Red side)
Prisoners and detainees of Finland
Finnish expatriates in Russia
Finnish refugees
Refugees in Russia